In geometry, a 9-cube is a nine-dimensional hypercube with 512 vertices, 2304 edges,  4608 square faces, 5376 cubic cells, 4032 tesseract 4-faces, 2016 5-cube 5-faces, 672 6-cube 6-faces, 144 7-cube 7-faces, and 18 8-cube 8-faces.

It can be named by its Schläfli symbol {4,37}, being composed of three 8-cubes around each 7-face. It is also called an enneract, a portmanteau of tesseract (the 4-cube) and enne for nine (dimensions) in Greek. It can also be called a regular octadeca-9-tope or octadecayotton, as a nine-dimensional polytope constructed with 18 regular facets.

It is a part of an infinite family of polytopes, called hypercubes. The dual of a 9-cube can be called a 9-orthoplex, and is a part of the infinite family of cross-polytopes.

Cartesian coordinates 
Cartesian coordinates for the vertices of a 9-cube centered at the origin and edge length 2 are
 (±1,±1,±1,±1,±1,±1,±1,±1,±1)
while the interior of the same consists of all points (x0, x1, x2, x3, x4, x5, x6, x7, x8) with −1 < xi < 1.

Projections

Images

Derived polytopes 

Applying an alternation operation, deleting alternating vertices of the 9-cube, creates another uniform polytope, called a 9-demicube, (part of an infinite family called demihypercubes), which has 18 8-demicube and 256 8-simplex facets.

Notes

References 
 H.S.M. Coxeter: 
 Coxeter, Regular Polytopes, (3rd edition, 1973), Dover edition, p. 296, Table I (iii): Regular Polytopes, three regular polytopes in n-dimensions (n≥5)
 H.S.M. Coxeter, Regular Polytopes, 3rd Edition, Dover New York, 1973, p. 296, Table I (iii): Regular Polytopes, three regular polytopes in n-dimensions (n≥5)
 Kaleidoscopes: Selected Writings of H.S.M. Coxeter, edited by F. Arthur Sherk, Peter McMullen, Anthony C. Thompson, Asia Ivic Weiss, Wiley-Interscience Publication, 1995,  
 (Paper 22) H.S.M. Coxeter, Regular and Semi Regular Polytopes I, [Math. Zeit. 46 (1940) 380-407, MR 2,10]
 (Paper 23) H.S.M. Coxeter, Regular and Semi-Regular Polytopes II, [Math. Zeit. 188 (1985) 559-591]
 (Paper 24) H.S.M. Coxeter, Regular and Semi-Regular Polytopes III, [Math. Zeit. 200 (1988) 3-45]
 Norman Johnson Uniform Polytopes, Manuscript (1991)
 N.W. Johnson: The Theory of Uniform Polytopes and Honeycombs, Ph.D. (1966)

External links 
 

 Multi-dimensional Glossary: hypercube Garrett Jones

9-polytopes